Midland Montessori School is an American Montessori Society-affiliated nonprofit organization in Midland, Michigan, United States. It is Midland's largest and oldest school that teaches children based on the Montessori philosophy.

The school is run by a board of directors recruited from the parent community along with the school administration. Board members are elected on an annual basis and hold their position for a minimum of one year.

In 2012 the school celebrated its 40th anniversary.

History 
 1970 - The school was founded in Midland by a group of interested parents under the name "Saginaw Valley Montessori Association".
 1971 - The school opened its doors under the name "Midland Montessori School" in a rented facility.
 1979 - A new building was constructed on a property owned by the school on Eastman Road and the school subsequently moved to its permanent location. The school began operating in the new building on October 8.
 1982 - The lower level of the building was finished to accommodate a new classroom.
 1989 - The facility expanded again and doubled in size.
 1998 - Two new classrooms were added.
 2002 - Additional facilities, including a library and a gross motor room were added
 2004 - An infant/toddler program was introduced. During this year the school transitioned its childcare/preschool combination into an all day Montessori program. New flooring, furniture and accessories were added.
 2008 - Two new playground structures and a bike path were added, along with an upgrade of the existing garden.
 2009 - An all year Montessori program was added.

Facilities 
The school has seven classrooms, two of which include a child-accessible kitchen. The overall available space is 9,000 square feet on two levels.

Located on the lower level is a large indoor gym and a library with two computers.

Outside are three playground structures with a swing set, a fenced-in grass area, and a bike path.

Community activities 
Children are engaged in community activities early on, including parent / student parades, or fund raisers.

Affiliations 
 American Montessori Society
 Montessori Administrators Association
 Michigan Montessori Society
 North American Montessori Teachers' Association

References

External links 
 www.midlandmontessori.com
 Facebook presence

Child care
Early childhood education
Montessori schools in the United States
Non-profit organizations based in Michigan